

205001–205100 

|-bgcolor=#f2f2f2
| colspan=4 align=center | 
|}

205101–205200 

|-bgcolor=#f2f2f2
| colspan=4 align=center | 
|}

205201–205300 

|-bgcolor=#f2f2f2
| colspan=4 align=center | 
|}

205301–205400 

|-bgcolor=#f2f2f2
| colspan=4 align=center | 
|}

205401–205500 

|-id=424
| 205424 Bibracte ||  || Bibracte, capital of the Haeduans Celtic tribe during the first century B.C and was situated at the Mont Beuvray, Morvan, France || 
|}

205501–205600 

|-id=599
| 205599 Walkowicz ||  || Lucianne Walkowicz (born 1979), an American astronomer with the Sloan Digital Sky Survey who researches the activity of stellar magnetic fields impacting planetary habitability || 
|}

205601–205700 

|-id=698
| 205698 Troiani ||  || Daniel M. Troiani (born 1952), an amateur astronomer which is dedicated to planetary observing, especially of Mars || 
|}

205701–205800 

|-bgcolor=#f2f2f2
| colspan=4 align=center | 
|}

205801–205900 

|-bgcolor=#f2f2f2
| colspan=4 align=center | 
|}

205901–206000 

|-bgcolor=#f2f2f2
| colspan=4 align=center | 
|}

References 

205001-206000